Patrick Brian Murphy (born June 10, 1995) is an American professional baseball pitcher in the Minnesota Twins organization. He previously played in MLB for the Toronto Blue Jays and Washington Nationals.

Amateur career
Murphy attended Hamilton High School in his hometown of Chandler, Arizona. In 2012, he underwent Tommy John surgery, and missed the entire 2013 season as a result. He had committed to attend the University of Oregon before being selected in the third round of the 2013 Major League Baseball draft by the Toronto Blue Jays. He signed with the Blue Jays for a $500,000 bonus, and reported to Dunedin, Florida for rehab.

Professional career

Toronto Blue Jays
Murphy made his professional debut with the Rookie-level Gulf Coast League Blue Jays in 2014. After pitching four innings, he was shut down with hand and arm numbness. It was later determined that one of his ribs was pinching a nerve, and underwent surgery to remove the rib shortly afterward. The numbness persisted, which led doctors to remove a nerve in his pitching elbow, which caused him to miss the entire 2015 season. Fully healthy for 2016, Murphy split time between the Short Season-A Vancouver Canadians and the Class-A Lansing Lugnuts. He made 21 appearances during the 2016 season, 15 of which were starts, and posted a 4–6 win–loss record, 3.18 earned run average (ERA), and 68 strikeouts in 90 innings pitched. Murphy made most of his appearances in 2017 for Lansing, and also played in the GCL and for the Advanced-A Dunedin Blue Jays. In total he went 5–4 with a 3.04 ERA and 77 strikeouts in 106 innings.

The Blue Jays added Murphy to their 40-man roster after the 2018 season. On September 18, 2020, the Blue Jays promoted Murphy to the major leagues for the first time, and he made his debut against the Philadelphia Phillies. With the 2020 Toronto Blue Jays, Murphy appeared in four games, compiling a 0-0 record with 1.50 ERA and five strikeouts in six innings pitched.

On February 28, 2021, Murphy was placed on the 60-day injured list due to a sprained AC joint in his shoulder. He was activated off of the injured list on June 16. On August 11, Murphy was designated for assignment by the Blue Jays.

Washington Nationals
The Washington Nationals claimed Murphy off waivers on August 14, 2021, and assigned him to their Triple-A affiliate, the Rochester Red Wings. 

Murphy made 6 appearances for Washington in 2022, posting a 6.35 ERA with 4 strikeouts in 5.2 innings pitched. He was designated for assignment on April 21, 2022. Murphy cleared waivers and was sent outright to Triple-A Rochester on April 27. He spent the remainder of the year there, making 40 appearances and pitching to a 3-3 record and 5.00 ERA with 73 strikeouts in 63.0 innings of work. He elected free agency on November 10, 2022.

Minnesota Twins
On December 13, 2022, Murphy signed a minor league deal with the Minnesota Twins with an invite to spring training.

References

External links

1995 births
Living people
Sportspeople from Chandler, Arizona
Baseball players from Arizona
Major League Baseball pitchers
Toronto Blue Jays players
Washington Nationals players
Gulf Coast Blue Jays players
Vancouver Canadians players
Lansing Lugnuts players
Dunedin Blue Jays players
New Hampshire Fisher Cats players
Buffalo Bisons (minor league) players